Ashton is a town located on Union Island, which is part of the Grenadines island chain of Saint Vincent and the Grenadines, located on the island's south coast. It has a Köppen climate classification code of Af.

References

Scott, C. R. (ed.) (2005) Insight guide: Caribbean (5th edition). London: Apa Publications.

Populated places in Saint Vincent and the Grenadines